Princess Charlotte was launched in 1814 at Bristol. She spent almost all of her career as a West Indiaman though she did make voyages to North America and Africa. In 1848 she was sold for breaking up.

Career
Princess Charlotte first appeared in Lloyd's Register (LR) in 1815.

Fate
In 1848 Princess Charlotte was sold in 1848 for breaking up.

Citations and references
Citations

References
 
 

1814 ships
Ships built in Bristol
Age of Sail merchant ships of England